Dam Tang-e Nal Ashkenan-e Mahtab (also Romanized as Dam Tang Naʿl Ashkenān-e Mahtāb) is a village in Tayebi-ye Sarhadi-ye Sharqi Rural District, Charusa District, Kohgiluyeh County, Kohgiluyeh and Boyer-Ahmad Province, Iran. At the 2006 census, its population was 16, in 5 families.

References 

Populated places in Kohgiluyeh County